Llano Grande is a flat area among mountains in State of Mexico in Mexico. It is an old volcanic caldera. It is at latitude 19.9910661 degrees north, longitude 99.6458468 degrees west.

References

External links
Google Earth view

Calderas of Mexico
Landforms of the State of Mexico
Pleistocene calderas